Veikko Lauri Hietanen (12 March 1928 – 23 November 2012) was a Finnish diplomat, with a degree in Political Science. He was Finnish ambassador to Addis Ababa and Nairobi from 1971 to 1977, a negotiating officer from the Ministry for Foreign Affairs from 1977 to 1981 and Finnish Ambassador to Beirut and Damascus 1981– 1984.

Hietanen began working as a trainee at the Foreign Ministry in 1956 and from 1958 he worked abroad in various countries until he became Finnish Ambassador to Ethiopia.

References

Ambassadors of Finland to Ethiopia
Ambassadors of Finland to Kenya
Ambassadors of Finland to Syria
Ambassadors of Finland to Lebanon
1928 births
2012 deaths